Banja  is a village in municipality of Malisheva in Republic of Kosovo. The village has an area of 1305 ha. The village is named after a local spring with warm water that has healing properties. The toponym is of Serbian origin - banja (lit. spa).

History
It was first mentioned in 1348, in Holy Archangel charter of emperor Stephen Uroš IV Dušan of Serbia. Above the village there were two churches, which villagers called Kiša and Other Kiša. "Kisha" in the Albanian language literally translates to Church.

In April 2020, 20 residents of the town were in isolation due to the COVID-19 pandemic.

Demography

Notable people
Fatmir Limaj

Notes

References 

Villages in Mališevo